Tulata is a rural locality (a settlement) in Solyansky Selsoviet, Narimanovsky District, Astrakhan Oblast, Russia. The population was 53 as of 2010.

Geography 
Tulata is located 115 km southwest of Narimanov (the district's administrative centre) by road. Solyony is the nearest rural locality.

References 

Rural localities in Narimanovsky District